Justin Currie (born September 19, 1993) is an American football safety and linebacker who is currently a free agent. He played college football at Western Michigan and was signed by the New York Giants as an undrafted free agent in 2015.

Professional career

New York Giants
On May 7, 2015, Currie was signed by the New York Giants as an undrafted free agent. He fractured his ankle in a preseason game against the Jaguars and spent his entire rookie year on injured reserve.

On September 3, 2016, Currie was released by the Giants.

Cleveland Browns
On December 7, 2016, Currie was signed to the Cleveland Browns' practice squad. He signed a reserve/future contract with the Browns on January 2, 2017.

On August 23, 2017, Currie was waived/injured by the Browns after suffering an ankle injury in the team's second preseason game. He was re-signed by the Browns on November 21, 2017. He was waived on November 30, 2017 and was re-signed to the practice squad. He was promoted to the active roster on December 8, 2017.

On August 31, 2018, Currie was waived/injured by the Browns and was placed on injured reserve. He was released on September 11, 2018.

Seattle Seahawks
On October 23, 2018, Currie was signed to the Seattle Seahawks practice squad. He signed a reserve/future contract on January 7, 2019. He was waived/injured on August 31, 2019 and placed on injured reserve. He was waived from injured reserve on September 30.

References

External links
Western Michigan Broncos bio

Living people
1993 births
American football defensive backs
Cleveland Browns players
New York Giants players
People from Big Rapids, Michigan
Players of American football from Michigan
Seattle Seahawks players
Sportspeople from Royal Oak, Michigan
Western Michigan Broncos football players